Marco Meloni (Active 15th-16th centuries) was an Italian painter during the Renaissance period. He was born in Carpi, Emilia-Romagna, but was mainly active in and around Modena. He was a follower of Bianchi Ferrari and Francesco Francia.

Tiraboschi mentions that he is also called il Meloncino or il Carpigianino. He painted a number of canvases for the church of San Bernardino da Siena, Carpi, including an Enthroned Madonna and Child with John the Baptist, and Saints Bernardino of Siena, Jerome, Francis, and Angels (1505).

References

Year of birth unknown
Year of death unknown
Italian Renaissance painters
15th-century Italian painters
Italian male painters
16th-century Italian painters
Painters from Modena